USCGC Cape Upright was United States Coast Guard steel-hulled patrol boat of the 95-Foot or Cape class.

Service
 1953: From here stationed at Norfolk, Virginia, to 1960 and was used for law enforcement (LE) and Search and Rescue (SAR) operations.
 1961: From here to 1969, stationed at Southport, North Carolina where she was again used for LE and participated in many SAR operations. Cape Upright participated in the recovery of a U.S. Navy seaman's body whose helicopter crashed off Frying Pan Shoals Light Tower in January 1967.  Three crew members were recovered alive and another went down with the helicopter
 29 April 1969, medevaced a crewman from F/V Thalia.
 28 July 1969: towed the disabled schooner Chauve Souris 19 miles west of Frying Pan Light Tower to Southport, NC.
 24 December 1969: towed the disabled F/V Dream One 45 miles east of Wrightsville Beach, North Carolina.
 1970: From here to 1973, was stationed at Wrightsville Beach, NC, being used again for LE and SAR operations.
 31 July 1970, towed the disabled sailboat Pandora 35 miles southeast of Cape Fear to Wrightsville Beach.
 1974: From here to 1976, was held for transfer to Lebanon under the Military Assistance Program.
 1976-1977: underwent major renovation at the Coast Guard Yard, Curtis Bay, Maryland.
 1978 to 1989: was stationed at Savannah, Georgia, and was used for LE and SAR operations.
 10 September 1982: helped seize M/V Mont Boron, which was suspected of drug smuggling off Florida.
 28 November 1982: seized the Cayman Island vessel Largo Izabel carrying 30 tons of marijuana after stopping her with gunfire.
 18 November 1986: seized a speedboat in the Straits of Florida with marijuana on board.
 21 November 1986: seized M/V Don Yeyo 120 miles east of Miami, Florida, carrying 12 tons of marijuana.

Transfer
Cape Upright was transferred to The Bahamas 10 June 1989 and renamed David Tucker (P07).

Decommissioning
David Tucker (P07) was decommissioned in 1996 and donated to be sunk as an artificial reef in 1997 as part of Nassau's artificial reef program. A popular dive spot; it is located along an area known as Clifton Wall.

References

 

Upright
Cape-class cutters of the Royal Bahamas Defence Force
Ships sunk as artificial reefs
Maritime incidents in 1997
Ships built by the United States Coast Guard Yard
Shipwrecks of the Bahamas